Daniel Diges is the self-titled debut album from Spanish singer, pianist, composer and actor Daniel Diges, released on 18 May 2010. The first single from the album "Algo pequeñito" released on 12 April 2010.

Singles
"Algo pequeñito" was the first single released from the album; Daniel Diges performed the song for Spain at the Eurovision Song Contest 2010. In the final Diges scored 68 points and finished 15th.
"Quédate conmigo" was the second single from the album released on 9 August 2010 as a Digital download.

Track listing

Charts

Release history

References 

2010 debut albums
Daniel Diges albums

tr:Quédate Conmigo